Holger Seitz (born 9 October 1974) is a German football manager and former professional player who is the manager of Bayern Munich II.

Early life
Seitz was born in Simbach am Inn, West Germany on 9 October 1974.

Playing career
Seitz came through the youth system of 1. FC Nürnberg. Then he played for 1. FC Nürnberg II, Greuther Fürth, Bayern Munich II, Karlsruher SC, SV Darmstadt 98, and SC Fürstenfeldbruck.

Coaching career

Bayern Munich II
Seitz joined Bayern Munich's youth section as a coach in 2015 before joining Bayern Munich II in 2018.

Seitz became the manager of Bayern Munich II on 8 May 2018. Bayern Munich II started pre–season, prior to the 2018–19 Regionalliga Bayern season, with a 2–2 draw against FC Liefering on 6 July 2018. His first competitive match was a 5–1 win against VfB Eichstätt. He was replaced by Sebastian Hoeneß on 14 June 2019. He finished with a record of 23 wins, seven draws, and six losses.

Seitz returned to manage Bayern Munich II on 25 August 2020. His first competitive match since returning as manager was a 2–2 draw against Türkgücü München. Martín Demichelis and Danny Schwarz replaced Seitz as Bayern Munich II manager. His last match was against VfB Lübeck. Seitz returned to managing Bayern II in November 2022 as Demichelis was hired by River Plate. His first match Bayern Munich II's match was scheduled for 19 November 2022 against Türkgücü Munich. But it ended up being rescheduled with no supporters allowed in.

Career statistics

Playing

Managerial record

References

External links

German footballers
Footballers from Bavaria
2. Bundesliga players
Regionalliga players
Oberliga (football) players
FC Bayern Munich II players
Karlsruher SC players
SV Darmstadt 98 players
3. Liga managers
FC Bayern Munich II managers
Living people
1974 births
Association football midfielders
1. FC Nürnberg II players
SpVgg Greuther Fürth players
German football managers